Twenty-nine people are recorded as having directed fictional films in the Dutch East Indies between 1926, when L. Heuveldorp released Loetoeng Kasaroeng, the colony's first domestically produced film, and 1949, when the Dutch formally recognised Indonesia's sovereignty after a four-year revolution, leaving the Dutch East Indies defunct. Thirteen directors active in the Indies continued to direct films after 1950, including Usmar Ismail: his 1950 film Darah dan Doa (The Long March) is generally considered the first truly Indonesian film.

The colony's first directors, Heuveldorp and G. Kruger, were of European or mixed descent. They were followed by ethnic Chinese soon after, when Nelson Wong made his debut in 1928 with Lily van Java; other Chinese directors included Lie Tek Swie (1929), Wong's brothers Joshua and Othniel (1930), and The Teng Chun (1931). Ethnic Chinese directors dominated the colony's cinema for the remainder of its existence. The first native director, Bachtiar Effendi, made his debut in 1932 with the talkie Njai Dasima; another native director would not appear until Andjar Asmara and Rd Ariffien made their debuts in 1940.

The directors active in the Indies came from various backgrounds. Some, like The Teng Chun, Fred Young, and the Wongs, had been interested in film since their youth. Others, such as Njoo Cheong Seng and Andjar, had a background in theatre. Still others, including Albert Balink and Ismail, were journalists by trade. They were all men; the first woman to direct a film in the Indonesian archipelago, Ratna Asmara, made her debut after the Indies were dissolved. Between them, the 29 men directed some 103 films, at times working collaboratively; it was not unusual for them to take more than one role in production. However, they generally had less creative control than the producer.

The following list is sorted alphabetically by default, with further sorting capability in certain fields; owing to differing naming conventions between cultures, not all entries are sorted by last name. The list only counts fictional films directed by the subjects and does not include films from other genres or films in which the person held other roles. The names of persons credited with an abbreviated name are written in full, where available.


Film directors

Explanatory notes

Footnotes

Works cited

 
 
 
 
 
 
 
 
 
 
 
 
 
 
 
 
 
 
 
 
 
 
 
 
 
 
 
 
 
 
 
 
 
 
 
 
 
 

List
Dutch East Indies